National Cycle Network (NCN) Route 62 is a Sustrans National Route that runs from Fleetwood to Selby. As of 2018 the route has a missing section between Preston and Southport  but is otherwise open and signed.

History 
Much of route 62 was created as part of the Trans Pennine Trail, a long-distance path running from coast to coast across Northern England. It forms part of European walking route E8. It was given the route number 62 in reference to the M62 motorway which it running parallel to between Liverpool and Selby.

Route

Fleetwood to Hutton
The western trailhead is in Fleetwood. The route follows the coast  on traffic-free paths to Lytham St Annes via  Blackpool. From Lytham, the route follows minor roads to the western outskirts of Preston. Passing through the city centre the route reaches Hutton. From here to the northern edge of Southport the route has yet to be determined.

Southport to Stockport

From Southport to Widnes the route is extensively traffic-free.  It is mainly made up of old railway lines including the Liverpool Loop Line through the city's eastern suburbs. Continuing on canals and old railway lines between Widnes and Altrincham. The route then follows the River Mersey though Manchester southern suburbs to reach Stockport.

Stockport to Selby
Route 62 continues from Stockport on a mixture of traffic-free and on-road routes. From Hadfield it crosses the Peak District, heading up the Longdendale valley via the Longdendale Trail to Woodhead, then down through Dunford Bridge, Penistone and Doncaster. The eastern trailhead is in Selby where it meets Route 65.

Local routes and trails 
Several sections of Route 62 are signed as local routes or trails. These include:
 Longdendale Trail
 Liverpool Loop Line
 Slow Tour of Yorkshire Stage 14: Barnsley to Old Moor RSPB Reserve
 Slow Tour of Yorkshire Stage 15: Penistone to Dunford Bridge
 Slow Tour of Yorkshire Stage 17: Doncaster to Conisbrough

Related NCN routes 
Route 62 meets the following routes:
 Route 622 at Preston
 Route 6 at Preston and Reddish Vale
 Route 55 at Preston, East Didsbury and Stockport
 Route 56 at Liverpool
 Route 82 at Widness and Stretford
 Route 85 at West Didsbury
 Route 558 at Stockport
 Route 68 at Charlesworth and Dunford Bridge
 Route 627 at Millhouse and Green Oxspring
 Route 67 at Barnsley and Brampton
 Route 65 at Selby

Route 62 is part of the Trans Pennine Trail (east) along with Route 65.

Route 62 is part of the Pennine Cycleway along with Route 68.

References

External links 

 Route 62 on Sustrans

Cycleways in England
Pennines
Transport in Merseyside